Javadiyeh (also Romanized as Javādīyeh) is a village in Chahar Cheshmeh Rural District, Kamareh District, Khomeyn County, Markazi Province, Iran. At the 2006 census, its population was 574, in 162 families.

References 

Populated places in Khomeyn County